

Historical and architectural interest bridges

Major bridges

References 
 

 Others references

See also 

 Geography of Jordan
 Transport in Jordan

Jordan

Bridges
b